José Pérez Castañe (born 7 January 1961 in Blanes) is a sailor from Spain, who represented his country at the 1988 Summer Olympics in Busan, South Korea as crew member in the Star. With helmsman Juan Costas they took the 17th place.

Sources
 

Living people
1961 births
Sailors at the 1988 Summer Olympics – Star
Olympic sailors of Spain
People from Selva
Sportspeople from the Province of Girona
Spanish male sailors (sport)